Qazigund railway station lies on Northern Railway network zone of Indian Railways. It is located in Qazigund Jammu and Kashmir, India. It is the main transport hub for the people of Qazigund.

Location
The station is situated near Qazigund town in Kulgam district, Jammu and Kashmir.

History

The station has been built as part of the Jammu–Baramulla line megaproject, intending to link the Kashmir Valley with Jammu Tawi and the rest of the Indian railway network. Those who accompanied them were Governor N.N. Vohra, Chief Minister Omar Abdullah, Railway Minister Mallikarjun Kharge and Union Health Minister Ghulam Nabi Azad.

Reduced Level
The RL of the station is 1671 m above mean sea level.

Design
Like every other station in this mega project, this station also features Kashmiri wood architecture, with an intended ambience of a royal court which is designed to complement the local surroundings to the station. Station signage is predominantly in Urdu, English and Hindi.

See also
Anantnag railway station
Srinagar railway station

References

Railway stations in Kulgam district
Railway stations opened in 2008
Firozpur railway division